The 2005–06 season was the 82nd season in the existence of AEK Athens F.C. and the 47th consecutive season in the top flight of Greek football. They competed in the Alpha Ethniki, the Greek Cup and the UEFA Cup. The season began on 29 August 2005 and finished on 14 May 2006.

Overview
Second season in a row for the administration of Demis Nikolaidis and for Fernando Santos on the team's bench. The plan was the same as that of the previous season, the tight budget and step by step for the team to finish as high as possible. However, in relation to the previous year, the enthusiasm and above all the same-mindedness was lacking. A huge role for the lack of unity was played by the events of the first match, in the away match against Atromitos, where, after incidents, Nikolaidis turned against with some of the ultras of AEK and since then nothing has interfered in the same way in the relations between Demis and a portion of the fans. In the summer transfer window, AEK made some useful additions, mainly those of the two Italians, Bruno Cirillo and Stefano Sorrentino, but also of the Ukrainian Oleh Venhlinskyi.

The team, with Nikos Liberopoulos and Kostas Katsouranis as their main players, even though they went for the championship, but it did not seem at any stage of the season to be able to displace Olympiacos from the top. In the end, he finished in 2nd place in a tie with Panathinaikos, 3 points behind the red and whites, but he took the ticket for the Champions League qualifiers of the next season. Also, there began to be a questioning of a part of the world and also of the management towards Fernando Santos, not so much for the efficiency, but for the defensive way the team was playing.

Just one year after the first meeting between the two teams, fortune again brought Zenit Saint Petersburg to the road of AEK in the UEFA Cup. This time, AEK were much more careful in defense and managed to leave St. Petersburg's Petrovsky Stadium with a goalless draw that gave them plenty of chances to qualify. The rematch of Olympic Stadium was expected to be difficult from the start and AEK again approached the game in the same way they faced Zenit in Russia. In the second half, AEK tried to take a little more risk by raising the lines, they had some good phases, but very soon the pace dropped again and while the game was heading to extra time, Andrey Arshavin, in the 89th minute, raced from the left, converged to the center and unleashed a powerful right-footed shot into Sorrentino's corner that touched of the ball but failed to clear the goal. The final result was 0–1 and AEK was left out of European competitions.

In the Greek Cup, AEK initially eliminated PAS Giannina with 0–3 in a single match. He then eliminated Ethnikos Piraeus in the penalty shoot-out and in the quarter-finals he eliminated Niki Volos. In the semi-finals, they played against Agrotikos Asteras, where they eliminated easily and thus advanced to the final against Olympiacos. On May 10 at the Pankritio Stadium, after a poor performance, AEK were defeated with the"hands down" with a score of 3–0 and lost the title.

Players

Squad information

NOTE: The players are the ones that have been announced by the AEK Athens' press release. No edits should be made unless a player arrival or exit is announced. Updated 30 June 2006, 23:59 UTC+3.

Transfers

In

Summer

Winter

Out

Summer

Winter

Loan in

Summer

Loan out

Summer

Winter

Renewals

Notes

 a.  AEK Athens enabled the player's buy-out clause, prematurely. The player's loan was expiring at 30 June 2006.

Overall transfer activity

Expenditure
Summer:  €1,350,000

Winter:  €550,000

Total:  €1,900,000

Income
Summer:  €0

Winter:  €150,000

Total:  €0

Net Totals
Summer:  €1,350,000

Winter:  €400,000

Total:  €1,750,000

Manager stats

Only competitive matches are counted. Wins, losses and draws are results at the final whistle; the results of penalty shootouts are not counted.

Pre-season and friendlies

Alpha Ethniki

League table

Results summary

Results by Matchday

Fixtures

Greek Cup

AEK entered the Greek Cup at the Round of 32.

Round of 32

Round of 16

Quarter-finals

Semi-finals

Final

UEFA Cup

First round

UEFA rankings

Statistics

Squad statistics

! colspan="13" style="background:#FFDE00; text-align:center" | Goalkeepers
|-

! colspan="13" style="background:#FFDE00; color:black; text-align:center;"| Defenders
|-

! colspan="13" style="background:#FFDE00; color:black; text-align:center;"| Midfielders
|-

! colspan="13" style="background:#FFDE00; color:black; text-align:center;"| Forwards
|-

! colspan="13" style="background:#FFDE00; color:black; text-align:center;"| Left during Winter Transfer Window
|-

|-
|}

Disciplinary record

|-
! colspan="17" style="background:#FFDE00; text-align:center" | Goalkeepers

|-
! colspan="17" style="background:#FFDE00; color:black; text-align:center;"| Defenders

|-
! colspan="17" style="background:#FFDE00; color:black; text-align:center;"| Midfielders

|-
! colspan="17" style="background:#FFDE00; color:black; text-align:center;"| Forwards

|-
! colspan="17" style="background:#FFDE00; color:black; text-align:center;"| Left during Winter Transfer window

|-
|}

Starting 11

References

External links
AEK Athens F.C. Official Website

Greek football clubs 2005–06 season
2005-06